The British Longhair is a medium-sized, semi-long-haired breed of domestic cat, originating in Great Britain.

History
The British Longhair is a longer-haired development from the longstanding British Shorthair breed.  In the mid-20th century, British Shorthairs were interbred with imported long-haired varieties, like the Turkish Angora and what today is called the Traditional Persian, with an aim to producing more stout and round-faced stock, while retaining the short coat. As a result of this hybridization, British catteries have frequently produced (generally unwanted) semi-long-haired offspring among their litters. In more recent years, these have been intentionally bred (often outside the UK) to each other and sometimes to standard British Shorthairs, to establish a consistent, formalized British Longhair breed.

Breed recognition
The breed is in the first stages of recognition with the two major cat fancy organizations in the UK, the Governing Council of the Cat Fancy and Felis Britannica (the UK branch of Fédération Internationale Féline).  The naming of the breed, and whether it is treated as a distinct breed, is quite inconsistent between the few pedigree registry organisations that acknowledge it .  It is called the British Longhair, British Longhair Variant, British Semi-Longhair, and Longhair British.  It is sometimes known as the Britannica in some European countries, and also the Lowlander in the United States.

Feline Federation Europe (FFE) calls them (in the same breed standard), the British Longhair Variant, the Highlander, and the Highland Straight. However, the latter two of those names have already been used by other registries to refer to completely different cats. The Highlander (with a variant, the Highlander Shorthair) is actually a development from the American Curl, and not closely related to the British breeds; it is a very large cat, with close-set, often upward-curling ears. The Highland Straight, a British breed, is actually the straight-eared variant of the Highland Fold; together, they are the longer-haired versions of the Scottish Straight and Scottish Fold, respectively. (TICA uses different terminology: Scottish Fold, Scottish Fold Longhair, Scottish Straight and Scottish Straight Longhair, to avoid confusion with the Highlander.)

Health

British Longhairs can be prone to obesity if neutered or kept as indoor-only cats.

Like most longer-haired cats, they require brushing or are prone to matting. Autumn and winter are the seasons when they have the highest risk of tangles because their coat thickens in preparation for winter.

The breed – like others derived from and including the Persian – have increased risk of inherited polycystic kidney disease (PKD), especially autosomal dominant polycystic kidney disease (ADPKD).

References

Cat breeds
Cat breeds originating in the United Kingdom